Kot is an administrative unit, known as Union council, of Malakand District in the Khyber Pakhtunkhwa province of Pakistan.

District Malakand has 2 Tehsils i.e. Swat Ranizai and Sam Ranizai. Each Tehsil comprises certain numbers of Union councils. There are 28 union councils in district Malakand.

See also 

Malakand District
Shafqat Ayaz is a Pakistani social worker and politician. He was born on 28 May 1988 in union council Kot dargai district malakand khyber pakhtunkhwa Pakistan. He is a nutrition consultant at northwest general hospital Peshawar and Joint secretary of PTI Malakand division.  He remained student politician and worked on different position in Insaf student federation. He was elected president of University of Agriculture Peshawar in 2011, then he became unopposed president of Peshawar University Campus (All 7 Universities) in 2013.

External links
Khyber-Pakhtunkhwa Government website section on Lower Dir
United Nations
Hajjinfo.org Uploads
PBS paiman.jsi.com

Malakand District
Populated places in Malakand District
Union councils of Khyber Pakhtunkhwa
Union Councils of Malakand District